Liolaemus gracilis, the graceful tree iguana,  is a species of lizard in the family  Liolaemidae. It is native to Argentina.

References

gracilis
Reptiles described in 1843
Taxa named by Thomas Bell (zoologist)
Reptiles of Argentina